Mehmed VI Vahideddin ( Meḥmed-i sâdis or  Vaḥîdü'd-Dîn;  or /; 14 January 1861 – 16 May 1926), also known as Şahbaba among the Osmanoğlu family, was the 36th and last Sultan of the Ottoman Empire, reigning from 4 July 1918 until 1 November 1922, when the Ottoman Empire was dissolved after World War I and replaced by the Republic of Turkey on 29 October 1923.

The brother of Mehmed V, he became heir to the throne in 1916, after the suicide of Abdülaziz's son, Şehzade Yusuf Izzeddin, as the eldest male member of the House of Osman. He acceded to the throne after the death of Mehmed V. He was girded with the Sword of Osman on 4 July 1918 as the thirty-sixth padishah. His father was Sultan Abdulmejid I, and his mother was Gülistu Kadın (1830–1865). She was of Georgian-Abkhazian origin, the daughter of Prince Tahir Bey Chachba, who was originally named Fatma Chachba. After her death, Mehmed was adopted by Şayeste Hanım.

Mehmed stepped down when the Ottoman Sultanate was abolished in 1922 and the secular Republic of Turkey was created, with Mustafa Kemal Atatürk as the first president.

Early life and education

Mehmed VI was born at the Dolmabahçe Palace, in Constantinople, on 14 January 1861. Mehmed's father died when Mehmed was only five months old, and Mehmed's mother died when he was four years old. He was raised and taught by his step-mother Şayeste Hanım. He trained himself by taking lessons from private teachers and attending some of the lessons given at Fatih Madrasa. The prince had a rough time with his overbearing stepmother, and at the age of 16 he left his stepmother's mansion with the three servants who had been serving him since childhood. He grew up with nannies, female servants, and tutors. During the thirty-three years of his brother Sultan Abdul Hamid II's reign he lived in the Ottoman Imperial Harem.
 
During his youth his closest friend was Abdulmejid II, the son of his uncle, Sultan Abdulaziz. In the years to come, however, the two cousins became unyielding rivals. Before moving to the Feriye Palace, the prince had lived briefly in the mansion in Çengelköy owned by Şehzade Ahmed Kemaleddin.

During the reign of Sultan Abdul Hamid, Mehmed was considered to be the Sultan's closest brother. In the years to come, when he ascended to the throne, this closeness would greatly influence his political attitudes, such as his intense dislike of the Young Turks and the Union and Progress Party, and his sympathy for the British.

Mehmed took private lessons. He read a great deal, and was interested in various subjects, including the arts, which was a tradition of the Ottoman family. He took courses in calligraphy and music and learned how to write in the naskh script and to play the kanun.

Then he became interested in Sufism and, unknown to the Palace, he followed courses at the madrasa of Fatih on Islamic jurisprudence, Islamic theology, interpretation of the Quran, and the Hadiths, as well as in Arabic and Persian. He attended the dervish lodge of Ahmed Ziyaüddin Gümüşhanevi, located not far from the Sublime Porte, where Ömer Ziyaüddin of Dagestan was the spiritual leader, and he became a disciple of the Naqshbandi order.

Reign

Mehmed succeeded to the throne after the death of his half-brother Mehmed V, on 3 July 1918.

The First World War was a disaster for the Ottoman Empire. British and allied forces captured Baghdad, Damascus, and Jerusalem during the war, and most of the Ottoman Empire was divided amongst the European allies. At the San Remo conference of April 1920, the French were granted a mandate over Syria and the British were granted one over Palestine and Mesopotamia. On 10 August 1920, Mehmed's representatives signed the Treaty of Sèvres, which recognised the mandates and recognised Hejaz as an independent state.

The Sultan requested the resignation of the Unionist government and assigned Ahmed Tevfik Pasha to form the government.  In the speech of the opening of the new legislative year of the parliament, Woodrow Wilson said that he applied for peace according to his principles, that he wanted peace in accordance with the honour and dignity of the state, that he believed that the precious places of the homeland were not occupied, and that the army would begin heroically.  Mustafa Kemal Pasha, who sent a telegram to the Sultan, asked the government to establish Ahmed Izzet Pasha and make him a minister of Harbiye.The sultan assigned the task of forming the government to his son Ahmed Izzet Pasha.

The new government, consisting of members of the Liberty and Accord Party, arrested the leaders of the Committee of Union and Progress, including one of the former grand viziers, Said Halim Pasha. The trial of Boğazlıyan District Governor Kemal Bey was quickly concluded, and the death penalty was carried out in Beyazıt Square after the fatwa was signed by the sultan.

Meanwhile, the French General d'Esperey, who came to Istanbul, threatened to go to the palace with a battalion of soldiers and make what he wanted by burning the distractions of the sultan and his government. He called him to the embassy without visiting the Grand Vizier. The French handed over a list of thirty-six people they wanted to arrest to the government.

Turkish nationalists rejected the settlement by the Sultan's four signatories. A new government, the Turkish Grand National Assembly, under the leadership of Mustafa Kemal (Atatürk), was formed on 23 April 1920, in Ankara (then known as Angora). The new government denounced the rule of Mehmed VI and the command of Süleyman Şefik Pasha, who was in charge of the army commissioned to fight against the Turkish National Movement (the Kuvâ-i İnzibâtiyye); as a result, a temporary constitution was drafted.

On 22 July 1920, Şurayı Saltanat was gathered in Yıldız Palace to discuss the principles of the Treaty of Sèvres. The Sèvres Agreement was signed on 10 August 1920.  Since he had to resign two and a half-months later, Ferid Pasha founded the last delegation of Tevfik Pasha, the last delegation of the Ottoman Empire, on 2 October 1920.

Exile and death

As the nationalist movement strengthened its military positions in late August 1922, Mehmed VI, his five wives, and attendant eunuchs could no longer leave the safety of the palace. The Grand National Assembly of Turkey abolished the Sultanate on 1 November 1922, and Mehmed VI was expelled from Istanbul. One day before his departure, he had lunch with his daughter, Ulviye Sultan, and spent a night at her palace. Leaving aboard the British warship Malaya on 17 November 1922, he took care not to bring valuable items or jewellery, other than his personal belongings. British general Charles Harington himself took the last Ottoman ruler from Yıldız Palace. Ten people with the sultan were sent off early in the morning by an English battalion. He went into exile in Malta, later living on the Italian Riviera.

On 16 November 1922, Vahideddin wrote to Sir Charles Harington: "Sir, considering my life in danger in Istanbul, I take refuge with the British Government and request my transfer as soon as possible from Istanbul to another place. Mehmed Vahideddin, Caliph of the Muslims". Accompanied by his First Chamberlain, the bandmaster, his doctor, two confidential secretaries, a valet, a barber and two eunuchs, at 6am on 19 November, two British ambulances took them to the house of General Sir Charles Harington. 

On 19 November, Mehmed's first cousin and heir, Abdulmejid Efendi, was elected caliph, becoming the new head of the Imperial House of Osman as Abdulmejid II before the Caliphate was abolished by the Turkish Grand National Assembly in 1924.

Mehmed sent a declaration to the Caliphate Congress and protested the preparations made, declaring that he had never waived the right to reign and be caliph. The congress met on 13 May 1926, but Mehmed died without the news of the congress meeting on 16 May 1926 in Sanremo, Italy. His daughter Sabiha Sultan found money for a burial, and the coffin was taken to Syria and buried in the cemetery of the Sulaymaniyya Takiyya in Damascus.

Personality
Mehmed had an optimistic and patient personality according to the testimony of his relatives and employees. He was evidently a kind family man in his palace; outside, and especially at official ceremonies, he would stand cold, frowning and serious, and would not compliment anyone; he attached great importance to religious traditions; he would not tolerate rumors, nor would he allow them to circulate in his palace.  Even in his informal conversations, he always attracted attention with seriousness.  The sources in question also state that he was intelligent and quick-grasped, but he was under the influence of his entourage and especially those he believed in, that he had a very evident, unstable and stubborn temperament.

Mehmed VI had dealt with advanced literature, music, and calligraphy. His compositions were performed in the palace when he was on the throne.  The lyrics of the songs he repeatedly composed while in Tâif envision the longing of the country and the pain of not getting the news that they have left behind.  Sixty-three works belonging to him can be identified, but only forty works have notes.  His poems, which can be an example to his poetry, are only the lyrics of his songs. He was also a good calligrapher.

Gallery

Honours

Ottoman honours
 Order of House of Osman, Jeweled 
 Order of Glory, Jeweled
 Imtiyaz Medal, Jeweled
 Order of Osmanieh, Jeweled
 Order of the Medjidie, Jeweled

Foreign honours
 Prussia: Order of the Black Eagle of Prussia, 15 October 1917

Family

Consorts
Mehmed VI had five consorts:
Nazikeda Kadın (9 October 1866 - 4 April 1941). BaşKadin and only consort for twenty years, she is considered the last Ottoman Empress. She was born Emine Marşania, she was Abkhazian and before marrying Mehmed she was in the service of Cemile Sultan with her sisters and cousins. Mehmed got her married in 1885, after a year of insistence, after he threatened never to marry otherwise and that Nazikeda would be his only consort. He kept his word until, after giving him three daughters, Nazikeda could no longer have children, which forced Mehmed to take other consorts to have male heirs. She was described as tall and beautiful, buxom, with fair skin, light hazel eyes, and long auburn hair.
Inşirah Hanim (10 July 1887 - 10 June 1930). Born Seniye Voçibe, she was Circassian, the niece of Durriaden Kadin, consort of Mehmed V, older half-brother of Mehmed VI. She was tall, with beautiful blue eyes and very long dark brown hair. She was proposed by Mehmed in 1905. Inşirah refused, but was obliged by her father and her brother. Unhappy but still jealous, she divorced Mehmed in 1909, when she found a servant in his quarters. Having divorced before Mehmed's accession to the throne, she was never an Imperial Consort. Later she fell into depression. She tried to return to her husband in 1922, when he was in exile at Sanremo, Italy, but she was not allowed to see him and he was not notified of her presence. She attempted suicide twice. The first of hers was saved by her niece, but the second she managed by drowning herself in the Nile.
Müveddet Kadın (12 October 1893 - 20 December 1951). Second Imperial Consort and only consort other than Nazikeda to obtain the title of Kadın. Born Şadiye Çıhcı, she was introduced to the court by Habibe Hanım, treasurer of Mehmed's harem. They were married in 1911. She was tall, with blue eyes and auburn hair and was known as a very sweet, shy, kind-hearted and hardworking woman. She was also loved and respected by her stepdaughters. She bore Mehmed her only son, whose death caused her to fall into depression. After Mehmed's death she remarried, but divorced her after four years.
Nevvare Hanim (4 May 1901 - 13 June 1992). BaşIkbal. Born Ayşe Çıhçı, she was niece of Müveddet Kadın, who raised her. She married Mehmed in 1918, although Müveddet did everything possible to prevent this. She was tall and beautiful, with green eyes and long black hair, of a kind but proud disposition. She filed for divorce in 1922, when Mehmed was deposed and exiled, and she was granted it in 1924. After that, she remarried.
Nevzad Hanim (2 March 1902 - 23 June 1992). Second Ikbal and last woman to become consort of an Ottoman sultan. Born Nimet Bargu. She married Mehmed in 1921, previously she had been a Kalfa (servant) in the household of Şehzade Mehmed Ziyaeddin, son of Sultan Mehmed V. She was Mehmed's favorite consort in his later years, so much so that it is said that he never agreed to part with her. After Mehmed's death she retake her name to Nimet and remarried. By her second marriage she had a son and a daughter. She never agreed to talk about her years as Imperial Consort.

Sons
Mehmed VI had only one son:
Şehzade Mehmed Ertuğrul (5 November 1912 - 2 July 1944) - with Müveddet Kadın. He never married or had children.

Daughters
Mehmed VI had three daughters:
Münire Fenire Sultan (1888 - 1888, two weeks later) - with Nazikeda Kadın. Died an infant, she is sometimes regarded as twins rather than a single princess.
Fatma Ulviye Sultan (11 September  1892 - 1 January 1967) - with Nazikeda Kadın. Married twice, she had one daughter.
Rukiye Sabiha Sultan (19 March 1894 - 26 August 1971). She married Şehzade Ömer Faruk and had three daughters.

See also

 Line of succession to the former Ottoman throne

References

Sources

Further reading

 Fromkin, David, 1989. A Peace to End All Peace: The Fall of the Ottoman Empire and the Creation of the Modern Middle East

External links

1861 births
1926 deaths
Dethroned monarchs
20th-century Ottoman sultans
19th-century people from the Ottoman Empire
People from the Ottoman Empire of Abkhazian descent
Dolmabahçe Palace
Turks from the Ottoman Empire
Emigrants from the Ottoman Empire to Italy
Exiles from the Ottoman Empire
Heads of the Osmanoğlu family
Burials in the cemetery of the Sulaymaniyya Takiyya